The Runde River (formerly Lundi River) is a river in southeastern Zimbabwe. It is a tributary of the Save River and its major tributaries include the Ngezi River, Tokwe River, Mutirikwe River and Chiredzi River.

Characteristics and geography
The lower Runde River is an ephemeral sand river system, with permanent pools forming during the dry season. The river has generally low levels of pollution. The floodplain at the confluence with the Save River is an important wetland.

See also
 Chiredzi
 Wildlife of Zimbabwe

References

Rivers of Zimbabwe
Save River (Africa)